On marine vessels the Power Management System PMS is in charge of controlling the electrical system. Its task is to make sure that the electrical system is safe and efficient. If the power consumption is larger than the power production capacity, load shedding is used to avoid blackout. Other features could be to automatic start and stop consumers (e.g., diesel generators) as the load varies.

A complete switchboard and generator control system 
The marine Power Management System PMS is a complete switchboard and generator control system to synchronize the auxiliary engines of the ships by implementing automatic load sharing and optimizing the efficiency of the power plant. It handles various configurations of generators driven by diesel engines, steam turbines, and main engines in combination with switchboards of various complexity.

Power Management System PMS Operation 
Electrical energy in any combination of the Generators is implemented according to calculations of the electric power tables of each vessel. PMS System decides which Generators combination will be the best according to the Load Consumptions. The capacity of the Generators is such that in the event of any one generating set will be stopped then it will still be possible to supply all services necessary to provide normal operational conditions of propulsion and safety. Furthermore, it will be sufficient to start the largest motor of the ship without causing any other motor to stop or having any adverse effect on other equipment in operation. In general a PMS Power Management System performs the following functions on a Ship:
 Automatic Synchronizing
 Automatic Load Sharing
 Automatic Start/Stop/Stby Generators according to Load Demand
 Large Motors Automatic Blocking
 Load Analysis and Monitoring
 Three (3) Phase Management and Voltage Matching
 Redundant Power Distribution
 Frequency Control
 Blackout Start
 Selection of Generators Priority (first leading main, second and third stby generator in sequence)
 Equal Load Division between generators
 Tripping of non-essential load groups (load shedding in two steps)
 Blocking of heavy consumers
 Operation of second generator in case first generator will be loaded 80% of its capacity
 Operation of standby generator, in case of malfunction in any one of the two generators
 Manual, secured, semi-automatic and automatic mode operation selection of generators
 Control selection for generators in engine control room

Power Management System PMS Benefits 
 Diesel generator monitoring and control
 Diesel engine safety and start/stop
 Circuit breaker synchronize & connect
 Bus line voltage and frequency control
 Generator voltage and frequency control
 Generator load in KW and %
 Symmetric or asymmetric load sharing
 Load control with load shedding
 Separation of alarm, control and safety
 Single or multiple switchboard control
 Heavy consumers logic
 Automatic start and connect after blackout
 Automatic line frequency adjustment
 Control of diesel electric propulsion
 "Take me home mode", control of PTI with clutches etc.
 "One touch auto sequence", automatic mode control

Power Management System PMS Applications on Vessel Types 
 Tanker (ship)
 Bulk Carrier
 General Cargo Ship
 Container Ship
 LNG carrier / LPG carrier / Gas carrier
 Cruise Ship
 Yachts

References

3. http://www.km.kongsberg.com/ks/web/nokbg0240.nsf/AllWeb/A297BDC3A79BBB36C125726B00387597?OpenDocument

4. ABB Marine, Integrated Automation System

 
Electric power